Putnam Township is a township in Tioga County, Pennsylvania,  United States. The population was 401 at the 2020 census. Putnam Township is the village of Covington. Covington was formerly a borough that chose to become a township in 1892. It was settled in 1801.

Geography
According to the United States Census Bureau, the township has a total area of 0.6 square mile (1.6 km2), all  land.

Putnam Township is surrounded by Covington Township.

Demographics
As of the census of 2000, there were 428 people, 174 households, and 116 families residing in the township.  The population density was 681.9 people per square mile (262.3/km2).  There were 188 housing units at an average density of 299.5/sq mi (115.2/km2).  The racial makeup of the township was 99.53% White, 0.23% Native American, and 0.23% from two or more races. Hispanic or Latino of any race were 0.47% of the population.

There were 174 households, out of which 31.6% had children under the age of 18 living with them, 54.6% were married couples living together, 9.8% had a female householder with no husband present, and 32.8% were non-families. 28.2% of all households were made up of individuals, and 10.3% had someone living alone who was 65 years of age or older.  The average household size was 2.46 and the average family size was 3.02.

In the township the population was spread out, with 25.7% under the age of 18, 7.9% from 18 to 24, 30.8% from 25 to 44, 20.6% from 45 to 64, and 15.0% who were 65 years of age or older.  The median age was 36 years. For every 100 females, there were 88.5 males.  For every 100 females age 18 and over, there were 92.7 males.

The median income for a household in the township was $26,800, and the median income for a family was $32,083. Males had a median income of $24,038 versus $20,278 for females. The per capita income for the township was $14,349.  About 3.4% of families and 8.4% of the population were below the poverty line, including 6.2% of those under age 18 and 3.4% of those age 65 or over.

Community
Covington – A village located on U.S. Route 15; it is coterminous with Putnam Township.

References

Populated places established in 1801
Townships in Tioga County, Pennsylvania
Townships in Pennsylvania